Telugu may refer to:
 Telugu language, a major Dravidian language of India
 Telugu literature, is the body of works written in the Telugu language. 
 Telugu people, an ethno-linguistic group of India
 Telugu script, used to write the Telugu language
 Telugu (Unicode block), a block of Telugu characters in Unicode

See also
 Telugu cinema
 Telugu cuisine
 Telugu culture (disambiguation)
 Telugu states
 
 

Language and nationality disambiguation pages